La Rinconada is a Caracas Metro station on Line 3. It is the southern terminus of the line. It was opened on 15 October 2006 as part of the extension of Line 3 from El Valle to La Rinconada, but the intermediate stations were only opened on 9 January 2010. The adjacent station is Mercado.

References

Caracas Metro stations
2006 establishments in Venezuela
Railway stations opened in 2006